"Tripping Billies" is a song by the Dave Matthews Band, released as the fifth single from the album Crash. It peaked at #18 on the Billboard Modern Rock Tracks chart in June 1997. The original version of the song, which appeared on their independent release Remember Two Things, was featured on the soundtrack of the film White Man's Burden.

Singer-songwriter Jimmy Buffett has performed "Tripping Billies" at concerts on numerous occasions.

Track listing
"Tripping Billies" (Edit) — 4:18
"Tripping Billies" (Album Version) — 5:00
"Tripping Billies" (Live Version) — 5:28

Charts

Dave Matthews Band songs
1997 singles
1996 songs
Songs written by Dave Matthews
Song recordings produced by Steve Lillywhite
RCA Records singles